Viole Maribor, or simply Viole, are a Slovenian ultras group that supports NK Maribor. They are one of two major ultras groups in Slovenia, the other being their traditional rivals, Green Dragons, the supporters of NK Olimpija Ljubljana. The group was founded in 1989.

History
Their first organised support occurred on 2 August 1989, when NK Maribor played against Spartak Subotica. The first name of the group was Marinci (The Marines), which was changed to Viole in 1991. Their biggest European away game occurred against Liverpool in 2017, when Maribor played in the UEFA Champions League. More than 2,000 Viole members attended the match.

See also
NK Maribor

References

External links
Official website

Ultras groups
NK Maribor
1989 establishments in Slovenia